The 1924 Victorian Football Association season was the 46th season of the Australian rules football competition. The premiership was won by the Footscray Football Club, after it defeated Williamstown by 45 points in the final on 20 September.

Premiership 
The home-and-home season was played over eighteen rounds, with each club playing the others twice; then, the top four clubs contested a finals series under the amended Argus system to determine the premiers for the season.

Ladder

Finals

Notable events 
 Prior to the season, the V.F.A. became affiliated with the Victorian Junior Football Association. Under the arrangement, each of the junior clubs which served as a seconds team for a V.F.A. club joined the V.J.F.A; and, the V.J.F.A expanded to eighteen clubs in two divisions. The V.J.F.A. would end up becoming the V.F.A. seconds competition over the following few years.
 On 2 August, a combined Association team played against the visiting Perth Football Club team at the North Melbourne Recreation Reserve. Perth 5.8 (38) defeated the Association 4.12 (36) by two points.
 George Gough (Northcote) kicked 25 goals and 7 behinds in Northcote's match against Prahran in the final round of home-and-home matches on August 30. Gough broke the Association record of 18 goals in a match, scored by Dave McNamara (Essendon (A.)) in 1912, and broke the national record of 23 goals in a top level senior match, set by Bos Daly (Norwood) in 1893 and matched by Hugh Campbell (Western Australia) in 1924. Gough scored eleven goals in the final quarter.
 George Gough was the Association's leading goalscorer for the year, finishing with eighty goals in the home-and-home season.
 Bob Johnson (Northcote) won the Woodham Cup as the best and fairest player in the Association.
 Two clubs completed extremely long home winning streaks during the season:  left the Association at the end of the season, after being unbeaten at the Western Oval in 47 consecutive matches; and Port Melbourne was beaten at the Port Melbourne Cricket Ground for the first time since 1920, ending a 33-match winning streak.
 Premiers Footscray played off against League premiers  on 4 October in an exhibition match for Dame Nellie Melba's appeal for Limbless Soldiers. It was only the third match between League and Association teams since the breakaway of the League in 1897. Footscray 9.10 (64) defeated Essendon 4.12 (36) by 28 points.

External links 
 List of VFA premiers

References 

Victorian Football League seasons
VFL